Thomas Hauser (born 27 October 1953, in Zell am Ziller) is an Austrian former alpine skier who competed in the 1976 Winter Olympics.

External links
 sports-reference.com

1953 births
Living people
Austrian male alpine skiers
Olympic alpine skiers of Austria
Alpine skiers at the 1976 Winter Olympics
People from Schwaz District
Sportspeople from Tyrol (state)
20th-century Austrian people